The 2014-15 season was Duhok SC's 15th consecutive season in the Iraqi Premier League.

Match results

Iraqi Premier League

Current squad

Goal scorers

References

External links
 http://www.duhoksportclub.com
 http://www.goalzz.com/main.aspx?team=1772
 http://www.flashscore.com/soccer/iraq/super-league/

Iraqi football clubs 2014–15 season
Duhoc SC seasons

ca:Duhok SC
es:Duhok SC
fr:Duhok sport Club (Duhok)
it:Duhok Football Club
nl:Duhok sc